Bala Mahalleh-ye Golrudbar (also Romanized as Bālā Maḩalleh-ye Golrūdbār and Bālā Maḩalleh-ye Gol-e Rūdbār) is a village in Baz Kia Gurab Rural District, in the Central District of Lahijan County, Gilan Province, Iran. At the 2006 census, its population was 209, in 63 families.

References 

Populated places in Lahijan County